Franklin "Mac" McCain III (born February 6, 1998) is an American football cornerback for the Detroit Lions of the National Football League (NFL).

Early life and education
Mac McCain was born on February 6, 1998, in Greensboro, North Carolina. He attended James B. Dudley High School, compiling 96 tackles in his final two seasons, and earning all-area honorable mention honors as a senior. He earned a scholarship offer from North Carolina A&T in 2017.

As a true freshman, McCain started all 12 games, making six interceptions, three returned for touchdowns. In an upset win over Charlotte in his third game, he made a game-winning "pick six" in an upset 35–31 win. One week later, against Morgan State, McCain returned an interception 100 yards for a touchdown. He placed second on the team with 50 tackles, and ranked eighth in the nation for interceptions per game.

As a sophomore, McCain started all 8 games before suffering a season-ending knee injury. He finished the season with 37 tackles, 2 interceptions, and 10 pass deflections. Even though he missed the final four games, he still earned first-team all MEAC honors. In the second game of the season, he made a game-winning 100 yard pick six similar to the previous season's. He started nine games as a junior, before another season-ending injury occurred. He finished the year with 26 tackles and no interceptions. He did not play in 2020, as the season was canceled due to COVID-19.

Professional career

Denver Broncos
After going unselected in the 2021 NFL Draft, McCain was signed as an undrafted free agent by the Denver Broncos. He was released on August 29 and subsequently signed to the practice squad.

Philadelphia Eagles
On September 7, 2021, he was claimed by the Philadelphia Eagles and signed to the active roster. He made his NFL debut in week three, playing 13 special teams snaps in the 21–41 loss at the Dallas Cowboys. He was released on November 9.

Denver Broncos
On November 10, 2021, McCain was claimed off waivers by the Denver Broncos. He was waived on November 23, 2021.

Philadelphia Eagles (second stint)
On November 24, 2021, the Eagles claimed McCain off of waivers. He was waived on December 8. He was re-signed to the practice squad on December 13. He signed a reserve/future contract with the Eagles on January 18, 2022.

On August 30, 2022, McCain was waived by the Eagles and re-signed to the practice squad. He was released from the practice squad on November 17, 2022, then re-signed a week later.

Detroit Lions
On February 23, 2023, McCain signed with the Detroit Lions.

Personal life
He is the grandson of civil rights activist Franklin McCain.

References

External links
NFL.com bio

1998 births
Living people
Players of American football from North Carolina
American football defensive backs
North Carolina A&T Aggies football players
Denver Broncos players
Philadelphia Eagles players
Detroit Lions players